Seven ships of the Royal Navy have been named HMS Queen. It is one of the oldest ship names of the Royal Navy dating from the time of Henry III of England.
  was a ship built in 1225. She is mentioned in records for some 10 or 12 years after that year. Her fate is unknown.
She was renamed Royal Anne in 1756 and was broken up in 1767.
  was a 98-gun second rate launched in 1769. She was reduced to 74 guns in 1811 and was broken up in 1821.
  was a 110-gun first rate launched in 1839. In 1859 the ship was fitted with a screw propeller and reduced to 86 guns. She was broken up in 1871.
  was a  pre-dreadnought battleship launched in 1902. She was sold in 1920 and broken up in 1921.
She was launched in 1943 and transferred to the Royal Navy that year. She was returned to the United States Navy in 1946.

Other ships
  is the Canadian Naval Reserve Division in Regina, Saskatchewan. The battle honours of all HM Ships Queen have been inherited by HMCS Queen.
 Queen was an Indian service paddle sloop launched in 1839 and listed until 1860.

Battle honours
 Ushant 1781
 First of June 1794
 Groix Island 1795
 Crimea 1854-55
 Dardanelles 1915
 Atlantic 1944
 Norway 1945
 Arctic 1945

See also

References

 

Royal Navy ship names